Winfried Wiencek (born 2 January 1949 in Sengwarden) is a deaf sports official and former German deaf table tennis player. Since 2003 he has been General Secretary of the German Deaf Sports Association. He is president of the Deaf Sports Association North Rhine-Westphalia (German: Gehörlosen-Sportverband Nordrhein-Westfalen e.V.), and support of the Order of Merit of the Federal Republic of Germany.

Career 
Wiencek won 19 German titles and 36 NRW-Championship titles. He was a national player, coach at four European Championships and four World Games for the Deaf. He became involved with his club, Dortmund GTSV as a sportsman, youth officer, managing director and 1st chairman.

In 2006 he became president of Deaf Sports Association North Rhine-Westphalia, after serving as dressing youth officer, chief cashier, assessors and 2nd chairman.

At the German Deaf Sports Association, he was a youth secretary, association special warden for table tennis and board member. He was the technical director for table tennis at the European Deaf Sports Association (EDSO) and the International Committee of Sports for the Deaf (ICSD).

Athlete 

 German deaf champion table-tennis team (11): 1975–79, 1981–1984, 1994, 1997
 German deaf champion table tennis junior double: 1968
 German deaf champion table tennis junior mixed: 1970
 German deaf champion table tennis seniors double (2): 1989, 1991
 German deaf champion table tennis senior mixed: 1993
 NRW deaf champion table tennis singles (3): 1972–73, 1975
 NRW deaf champion table-tennis team (20): 1971–75, 1977–79, 1981–1982, 1985–89,1991–92, 1995, 1998-99
 NRW deaf champion table tennis doubles (10): 1972–75, 1977, 1979, 1981, 1986–1988,
 NRW deaf table Tennis Team Cup Winners (3): 1991, 1992, 1996
 TT-deaf national team (6): 1975-1980

Volunteer  

 2006–Present President of Deaf Sports Association NRW
 2002 - 2006 associate judge in Deaf Sports Association NRW
 1998 - 2002 2nd Chairman of the Deaf Sports Association North Rhine-Westphalia (NRW)
 1995 - 2003 assessors in the presidium of the German Deaf Sports Association
 1993 - 2003 technical director for table tennis in the EDSO (European Deaf Sports Association)
 1991 - 2001 technical director for table tennis in the CISS (Comité International des Sports des Sourds)
 1990 - 1998 associate judge in Deaf Sports Association North Rhine-Westphalia
 1988 - 1996 1st chairman deaf gymnastics and sports club Dortmund
 1984 - 1986 Managing Director of Deaf Sports and Gymnastics Club Dortmund
 1982 - 1986 treasurer in Deaf Sports Association of North Rhine-Westphalia
 1975 - 2002 association special warden TT in German Deaf Sports Association
 1974 - 1978 youth secretary of the German Deaf Sports Association
 1974 - 1976 youth officer deaf gymnastics and sports club Dortmund
 1971 - 1974 sports director deaf gymnastics and sports club Dortmund
 1970 - 1971 1st chairman deaf gymnastics and sports club Dortmund

Other 

 2013 Sofia: Deputy head of mission at the 2013 Summer Deaflympics
 2009 Taipei: Deputy head of mission at the 2009 Summer Deaflympics
 1991 Sofia: Supervisor of the German national team at the European Championship TT
 1989 Christchurch: Supervisor of the German deaf TT national team at World Games of the Deaf
 1987 Budapest: Supervisor of the German national team at the European Championship TT
 1985 Los Angeles: Supervisor of the German deaf TT national team at the World Games for the Deaf
 1983 Copenhagen: Supervisor of the German deaf TT team at the European Championships
 1981 Cologne: Supervisor of the German deaf TT national team at the World Games for the Deaf
 1979 Brussels: Supervisor of the German deaf TT team at the European Championships
 1977 Bucharest: Participate as athletes in table tennis at the World Games for the Deaf

Awards

See also 
 Deutscher Gehörlosen-Sportverband
 Deaflympics

References

External links 
 dg-sv.de Website des German Deaf Sports Association
 gsnrw.de Website des Sports Association of North Rhine-Westphalia

1949 births
Living people
Sportspeople from Dortmund
People from Wilhelmshaven
German male table tennis players
Officers Crosses of the Order of Merit of the Federal Republic of Germany
Deaf table tennis players
German deaf people
German table tennis coaches